Ruzz and Ben is an animated short film, directed by Philippe Jullien and released in 2005. The film centres on two children who are trying to recover their lost kite, when they discover a strange world presided over by a tall wooden puppet whom they mistake for a threatening figure.

The film was a Genie Award nominee for Best Animated Short at the 26th Genie Awards in 2006.

References

External links

2005 animated films
2005 films
2000s animated short films
National Film Board of Canada animated short films
2005 short films
Canadian animated short films
French animated short films
2000s Canadian films
2000s French films